For the Scottish international footballer see Kris Commons

Christopher John Commons (born 9 December 1950) is a retired long jumper from Australia, who represented his country in the 1976 Summer Olympics in Montreal.

Commons won silver medals in the 1974 and 1978 Commonwealth Games during his career. A four-time national champion in the men's long jump (1973–1976), he held the Australian Residential Long Jump Record of 8.08 metres. He won the Pacific Conference Games in 1977 and was second in the event in 1973.

Commons was ranked sixth in the world by the magazine Track & Field News in 1975. He received the Athlete of the Year award from the Athletics International organisation for the 1974–5 season.

As a young athlete, Commons was the Australian Junior Champion (under 19 years of age) in the triple jump for three consecutive years (1967-9).

His brothers, Don Commons (triple jump) and David Commons, were also notable athletes.

References

External links 
 Australian Athletics Historical Results
 Commonwealth Games Medallists - Men
 Track & Field News All-Time World Rankings 
 Athletics International Award Winners 
 Pacific Conference Games Medallists 

1950 births
Living people
Australian male long jumpers
Athletes (track and field) at the 1974 British Commonwealth Games
Athletes (track and field) at the 1978 Commonwealth Games
Olympic athletes of Australia
Athletes (track and field) at the 1976 Summer Olympics
Commonwealth Games medallists in athletics
Commonwealth Games silver medallists for Australia
20th-century Australian people
21st-century Australian people
Medallists at the 1974 British Commonwealth Games
Medallists at the 1978 Commonwealth Games